Petac may refer to:

 Petac River
 Janez Petač (1949–2011), Slovene ice hockey player

See also